The three brothers Abū Jaʿfar, Muḥammad ibn Mūsā ibn Shākir (before 803 – February 873); Abū al‐Qāsim, Aḥmad ibn Mūsā ibn Shākir (d. 9th century) and Al-Ḥasan ibn Mūsā ibn Shākir (d. 9th century), known as the Banū Mūsā ("Sons of  or Moses"), were Persian scholars, who lived and worked in Baghdad. 

The Banū Mūsā worked as researchers in the House of Wisdom, and in astronomical observatories established in Baghdad by the Abbasid Caliph al-Ma'mun. They participated in an expedition to make geodesic measurements to determine the length of a degree. Their most notable work is the Book of Ingenious Devices on automata (automatic machines) and mechanical devices. They also produced the Book on the Measurement of Plane and Spherical Figures, a work on geometry that was frequently quoted by both Islamic and European mathematicians.

Biographical details

Early years
Moḥammad, Aḥmad, and Ḥasan were the three sons of Mūsā ibn Shākir, who earlier in life had been a highwayman and an astronomer in Khorasan of unknown pedigree. After befriending al-Ma'mun, who was then a governor of Khorasan and staying in Merv, Musa was employed as an astrologer and astronomer. 

After Mūsā ibn Shākir's death, his young sons were cared for at the court of al-Maʾmūn. Al-Maʾmūn recognized the abilities of the three boys, and enrolled them in the House of Wisdom, a library and a translation centre in Baghdad.

Astronomical careers and translation work under the Abbasid Caliphate
Studying in the House of Wisdom under Yahya ibn Abi Mansur, the brothers participated in the efforts to translate ancient Greek works into Arabic by sending for Greek texts from the Byzantines, or travelling to Byzantium to acquire manuscripts. They paid large sums for their translation, and learning Greek themselves. On such trips, Muhammad met and recruited the mathematician and translator Thābit ibn Qurra. At some point the Arab Christian translator Hunayn ibn Ishaq was also part of their team. The brothers sponsored scientists and translators, who were paid about 500 dinars a month. Had it not been for the brothers' efforts in translating Greek texts, many would have been lost and forgotten. The Banū Mūsā wrote almost 20 books, the majority of which are now not extant.

The brothers are likely to have used portable instruments such as armillary spheres or dials when making their observations, which were recorded from around 847 to 869. From their Baghdad home, they observed stars in the constellation Ursa Major In 847-8, and  measured the maximum and minimum altitudes of the Sun in 868-9. They also observed the September equinox in the Persian city of Samarra.To calculate the difference in latitude between Samarra and Nishapur, they organized simultaneous observations of a lunar eclipse.

After the death of al-Ma'mun, the Banū Mūsā continued to acquire wealth and influence, as they worked under the Caliphs al-Mu'tasim, al-Wathiq, and al-Mutawakkil. However, during the reign of al-Wathiq and al-Mutawakkil internal rivalries arose between the scholars of the House of Wisdom. The Banū Mūsā became enemies of al-Kindi, and assisted in his persecution by al-Mutawakkil. They were later employed by al-Mutawakkil to construct a canal for the new city of al-Jafariyya.

Politics
The Banū Mūsā's employment by the caliphs for different civil engineering projects, including their involvement as part of a team that built the city of al-D̲j̲aʿfariyya for al-Mutawakki, led to them becoming involved involved in the politics of Baghdad. The peak of Muhammad's political activity came towards the end of his life, when Turkish commanders were starting to take control of the state. After the death of al-Mutawakkil, Muhammad helped al-Mustaʿīn to become nominated as caliph. Denied the throne, Al-Mustaʿīn's brother besieged Baghdad, and Muhammad was sent to estimate the size of the attacking army. After the siege, he was sent to find out the terms for al-Mustaʿīn to abdicate.

Works

Astronomy and astrology

The Banū Mūsā made many observations and contributions to the field of astronomy, writing nearly a dozen publications over their astronomical research. They made many observations on the Sun and the Moon. Al-Ma’mun had them go to a desert in Mesopotamia to measure the length of a degree along a meridian. They also measured the length of a solar year to be 365 days and 6 hours.

 Book on the First Motion of the Celestial Sphere (Kitāb Ḥarakāt al‐falak al‐ūlā), a lost work containing a critique of the Ptolemaic system. Muhammad in this book denied the existence of the Ptolemaic 9th sphere which Ptolemy thought was responsible for the motion; 
  ("Book on the Mathematical Proof by Geometry That There Is Not a Ninth Sphere Outside the Sphere of the Fixed Stars"), a lost book by Ahmed.

  ("Book on the Construction of the Astrolabe"), a work quoted by the 11th century Persian scholar al-Biruni;
  ("Book on the Solar Year"), which was once attributed to Thābit ibn Qurra;
  ("On the Visibility of the Crescent"), by Muhammad;
 Book on the Beginning of the World, by Muhammad, now lost;
 A separate non-extant  by the Banū Mūsā was mentioned by Ibn Yunus.
 A translation of a Chinese work called A Book of Degrees on the Nature of Zodiacal Signs;
 Kitāb al-Daraj ("The Book of Degrees"), a work by Ahmad.
 , a treatise containing a discussion  between Ahmad and the Persian Jewish scholar Sanad ibn Ali. Now lost.

Mathematics 
The Banū Mūsā had a different ideas about the mathematics of areas and circumferences from the ancient Greeks, who considered volume and area more in terms of ratios, rather than giving them an actual numerical value. The Banū Mūsā gave numerical values for the volumes and areas they calculated.

A Latin translation by the 12th century Italian astrologer Gerard of Cremona appeared under the titles Liber trium fratrum de geometria and Verba filiorum Moysi filii Sekir. This treatise on geometry was used extensively in the Middle Ages, quoted by authors such as Thābit ibn Qurra, Ibn al‐Haytham, Leonardo Fibonacci (in his Practica geometriae), Jordanus de Nemore, and Roger Bacon. Some theorems included in this book are not found in any work of the Greek mathematicians.

The other known mathematical works by the Banū Mūsā were:
 3 works relating to Conic Sections, by the astronomer Apollonius of Perga, including  ("Conic Sections of Apollonius"), a recension of the work, which was first translated to Arabic by Hilāl al-ḥimṣī and Thābit ibn Qurra (a lost book written by Muhammed).
  ("The Book of the Elongated Circular Figure"), a mathematical treatise by al-Hasan, now lost. It contained a description of a procedure used to draw an ellipse using a length of string, a technique that is now known as the "gardener's construction";
  ("Reasoning on the Trisection of an Angle"), by Aḥmad; The manuscript and medieval Latin translations are extant.
  ("Book on a Geometric Proposition Proved by Galen"). A lost book by Muhammed.

Technology

Most notable among their achievements is their work in the field of automation, which they utilized in toys and other entertaining creations. They have shown important advances over those of their Greek predecessors. The brothers are credited with inventing the first music sequencer, the earliest type of programmable machine.

  ("The Book of Ingenious Devices" (Persian: كتاب ترفندها Ketab tarfandha ("The Book of Tricks")), a work that describes 100 inventions. While designed primarily for amusement, they employ innovative engineering, such as automatic one-way and two-way valves, mechanical memories, devices capable of responding to feedback, and delay mechanisms. Most of the inventions were operated by water pressure.
  ("A Book on the Qarasṭūn"), a treatise on the weight balance, or steelyard. There is a similar work on the same subject written by Thabit bin Qurra, who was a student of the brothers.
 On Mechanical Devices, a work on pneumatic devices, written by Ahmad.
 A Book on the Description of the Instrument Which Sounds by Itself, an extant work about musical theory.

See also 
 Inventions in the Muslim world
 Science in the medieval Islamic world

References

Sources
 
 
 
  (PDF version)

Further reading
  (PDF version)

External links

 A list of works by the Banū Mūsā from the Islamic Scientific Manuscripts Initiative (ISMI) website
 Manuscript facsimile of the  held in the Princeton University Library
 Manuscript facsimile of The Book of Ingenious Devices held in the Vatican Library (Manuscript Vaticani Arabi 317)

873 deaths
People from Baghdad
Astronomers from the Abbasid Caliphate
Astronomers of the medieval Islamic world
Mathematicians from the Abbasid Caliphate
9th-century Iranian mathematicians
Iranian engineers
Iranian scientists
Medieval physicists
Year of birth unknown
Inventors of the medieval Islamic world
9th-century people from the Abbasid Caliphate
9th-century Iranian astronomers
9th-century inventors
Brothers